

N

References

Lists of words